Dres Flipper Anderson (born July 20, 1992) is an American football wide receiver who is a free agent. He most recently played for the Toronto Argonauts of the Canadian Football League (CFL). He played college football at the University of Utah.

Early years
Anderson attended John W. North High School in Riverside, California. He was rated by Rivals.com as a three-star recruit. He committed to the University of Utah to play college football.

College career
Anderson played at Utah from 2010 to 2014. After redshirting his first year, Anderson played in 44 games over the next four years. In his sophomore and junior seasons, he led the team in receiving. As a senior, he played in the first seven games before suffering a knee injury that ended his season. Anderson finished his career with 134 receptions for 2,077 yards and 17 receiving touchdowns.

Professional career

San Francisco 49ers
Anderson was signed as an undrafted free agent by the San Francisco 49ers after the 2015 NFL Draft, dropping because of concerns over his surgically repaired knee.

On September 3, 2016, Anderson was released by the 49ers, but re-signed to the team's practice squad the following day. On October 18, 2016, Anderson was released.

Chicago Bears
On November 22, 2016, Anderson was signed to the Bears' practice squad. He signed a reserve/future contract with the Bears on January 3, 2017. On May 1, 2017, Anderson was waived.

Houston Texans
On June 3, 2017, Anderson signed with the Houston Texans. He was waived on September 2, 2017.

Washington Redskins
On September 4, 2017, Anderson was signed to the Washington Redskins' practice squad. He was released by the team on September 26, 2017.

Indianapolis Colts
On November 13, 2017, Anderson was signed to the Indianapolis Colts' practice squad. He signed a reserve/future contract with the Colts on January 1, 2018. He was waived on August 12, 2018.

Dallas Cowboys
On August 15, 2018, he was signed as a free agent by the Dallas Cowboys, to provide depth during the preseason. He was waived on September 1, 2018 and was signed to the practice squad the next day. He was released on September 20, 2018.

Salt Lake Stallions (AAF)
On November 9, 2018, Anderson signed with the Salt Lake Stallions of the Alliance of American Football (AAF). He was placed on injured reserve on February 19, 2019. The league ceased operations in April 2019.

Toronto Argonauts
On December 16, 2019, Anderson was signed by the Toronto Argonauts of the Canadian Football League. He did not have a chance to play with the team after the CFL announced on August 17, that the 2020 season had been cancelled due to the COVID-19 pandemic in Canada, ongoing restrictions on public gatherings, and the league's inability to secure federal funding to cover the money lost from not having fans in the stands. He signed an extension with the team on December 23, 2020. He did, however, play in four regular season games in 2021 where he had 19 catches for 117 yards. He spent part of 2022 training camp with the team, but was released after the first pre-season game on May 29, 2022.

Personal life
Anderson's father, Flipper Anderson, played in the NFL from 1988 to 1997. His uncle Paco Craig, also played one year in the NFL.

References

External links
Utah Utes bio

1992 births
Living people
Sportspeople from Riverside, California
Players of American football from Riverside, California
American football wide receivers
Utah Utes football players
San Francisco 49ers players
Chicago Bears players
Houston Texans players
Washington Redskins players
Indianapolis Colts players
Dallas Cowboys players
Salt Lake Stallions players
Toronto Argonauts players
Players of Canadian football from California